Da grande is a 1987 Italian romantic comedy film directed by Franco Amurri, starring Renato Pozzetto, Ottavia Piccolo and Alessandro Haber.

Da grande is one of the coming-of-age comedies that were released in the late 1980s. It has been said to be the inspiration for Big, the 1988 international blockbuster directed by Penny Marshall and starring Tom Hanks.

Plot 

Eight-year-old Marco Marinelli is a bedwetter, scolded by his mother (Ottavia Piccolo) and teased by his classmates. On his birthday he finds out that his father (Alessandro Haber), who is facing economic difficulties, hasn't brought him the Lego he was promised. He runs in tears to his room and puts all his heart into wishing he were big and not subject to these indignities. As a result, he bursts through his clothes in the guise of a forty-year-old man (Renato Pozzetto) and seeks refuge in the house of his schoolteacher Francesca (Giulia Boschi), who he's secretly in love with. Mentally, he is still eight years old, and it's a puzzle what to do with him, until someone discovers that he has an uncanny rapport with children. Then he becomes a full-time and highly requested babysitter, but shortly after he is suspected of abducting the by-now long-missing child Marco. He then runs out of money, and fakes the kidnapping of himself, but while chased by the police he eventually turns back into the eight-year-old boy. He leaves a letter to Francesca who, upon realising the boy and man were one, uses the magic to join him as a little girl.

Cast 
Renato Pozzetto as grown-up Marco
Ioska Versari as normal Marco
Giulia Boschi as Francesca (Marco's teacher)
Alessandro Haber as Claudio (Marco's father)
Ottavia Piccolo as Anna (Marco's mother)
Alessandro Partexano as the police detective
Giampiero Bianchi as Nicola (Marco's uncle)
Gaia Piras as Silvietta (Marco's sister)
Ilary Blasi as the girl playing hide-and-seek

Reception 
Da grande won the Nastro d'argento for best story (Silver Ribbon), the oldest movie award in Europe, assigned since 1946 by Sindacato Nazionale dei Giornalisti Cinematografici Italiani (the association of Italian film critics).

References

External links 
 
 
 

1987 films
1980s Italian-language films
1987 romantic comedy films
Films directed by Franco Amurri
Films about rapid human age change
Italian romantic comedy films
1980s Italian films